Melissa Anne Villaseñor (born October 9, 1987) is an American stand-up comedian, actress, impressionist, writer, musician, and artist. First garnering attention for her stand-up shows and impressions, Villaseñor found wider success when she was hired to join the cast of the NBC sketch comedy series Saturday Night Live ahead of the show's 42nd season in 2016. She then departed SNL at the end of the 47th season in 2022, after six seasons as a cast member.

Early life
Villaseñor was born in Whittier, California, in Los Angeles County, on October 9, 1987, the daughter of Mexican parents Guadalupe "Lupe" Peralta and Miguel "Michael" Humberto Villaseñor. She is of Spanish, Basque, and indigenous Mexican descent, with roots in Jalisco and Aguascalientes, Mexico. (She also has 2% Sub-Saharan African DNA.) Villaseñor and actor Mario Lopez—whose Mexican ancestry was also explored on the same episode of Finding Your Roots—are genetically connected to director Alejandro G. Iñárritu. She attended the Catholic Ramona Convent Secondary School in Alhambra, California. At 15, she started performing stand-up comedy at the Laugh Factory Comedy Camp in Hollywood.

Career

Villaseñor was a semifinalist on the sixth season of America's Got Talent. Previously, she was selected for the New Faces lineup in the 2010 Just for Laughs Montreal Comedy Festival. She has also done voice work for the animated shows Adventure Time, Family Guy, and TripTank. She appeared on the second season of HBO's Crashing.

Villaseñor first auditioned for the late night sketch comedy/variety show Saturday Night Live in 2009, where she did several impressions but was not hired. Villaseñor was introduced as a featured player on the October 1, 2016 episode of Saturday Night Live, during the show's 2016 to 47th season. alongside Mikey Day and Alex Moffat. Her debut was an impression of Sarah Silverman in the Family Feud: Political Edition sketch. She is the second Latina cast member after Noël Wells, who is a quarter Mexican, and the first Latina to be promoted to repertory status. 

After she became a cast member, she deleted almost 2,000 old tweets, that she had posted mostly in 2010 and 2011, which some critics called racist. SNL and Villaseñor initially declined to comment on the accusation, but in September 2018, Villaseñor explained that she was "trying to be edgy" when she posted them, and that she did not regret deleting them. She told NPR's Weekend Edition Saturday, "I'm flawed like everyone else, and yeah, I just wanted to make sure I was perfect."

She was promoted to the cast's repertory players in season 44 in 2018. Villaseñor left the show at the end of the 47th season in 2022, after six years as a cast member. 

Her debut album, Dreamer, a pop-punk/power pop-influenced work, was released in October 2019. She is also an illustrator.

She helped Rob Cantor create his viral "29 Celebrity Impressions, 1 Original Song" video to promote his album Not a Trampoline, in which she sings impressions of Britney Spears, Christina Aguilera, and Björk.

She hosted the 2021 Independent Spirit Awards, and voiced Robin in the radio drama podcast Batman: The Audio Adventures.

Villaseñor describes herself as a comedian and impressionist. She has performed impressions for America's Got Talent, First Impressions, her YouTube channel, and SNL including Björk, Owen Wilson, Miley Cyrus, Gwen Stefani, Jennifer Lopez, Kate McKinnon, Kristen Wiig, Christina Aguilera, Britney Spears, Julia Louis-Dreyfus, Ana Navarro, Natalie Portman, Macaulay Culkin, Sarah Silverman, Lady Gaga, Dolly Parton, Billie Eilish, Dua Lipa and Alexandria Ocasio-Cortez.

Filmography

Discography

References

External links

 
 
 
 
 

1987 births
Living people
21st-century American actresses
21st-century American comedians
21st-century American singers
21st-century American women writers
Actresses from California
America's Got Talent contestants
American actresses of Mexican descent
American film actresses
American impressionists (entertainers)
American sketch comedians
American stand-up comedians
American television actresses
American ukulele players
American voice actresses
American women comedians
American women podcasters
American podcasters
Comedians from California
Hispanic and Latino American actresses
Songwriters from California